In integral geometry (otherwise called geometric probability theory), Hadwiger's theorem characterises the valuations on convex bodies in  It was proved by Hugo Hadwiger.

Introduction

Valuations 

Let  be the collection of all compact convex sets in  A valuation is a function  such that  and for every  that satisfy 

A valuation is called continuous if it is continuous with respect to the Hausdorff metric.

Quermassintegrals 

The quermassintegrals  are defined via Steiner's formula

where  is the Euclidean ball.

 is a valuation which is homogeneous of degree  that is,

Statement 

Any continuous valuation  on  that is invariant under rigid motions can be represented as

Corollary 

Any continuous valuation  on  that is invariant under rigid motions and homogeneous of degree  is a multiple of

See also

References 

An account and a proof of Hadwiger's theorem may be found in 
 

An elementary and self-contained proof was given by Beifang Chen in
 

Integral geometry
Theorems in convex geometry
Probability theorems